Alone is the tenth studio album by English-American rock band The Pretenders. The album was released on October 21, 2016, by BMG Rights Management.

Chrissie Hynde is the only member of the band to appear on the album (which may explain the chosen album title), with the backing band consisting of session musicians; this was also the case with Packed! (1990), the first Pretenders album that used this method. The album is the band's second consecutive album not to include drummer Martin Chambers.

Critical reception

Alone received generally positive reviews from music critics. At Metacritic, which assigns a normalized rating out of 100 to reviews from mainstream critics, the album received an average score of 77 based on 12 reviews, which indicates "generally favorable reviews".

Track listing

Personnel
Chrissie Hynde – vocals
Additional personnel
Dan Auerbach – guitar, keyboards, backing vocals
Duane Eddy, Kenny Vaughan – guitar
Russ Pahl – pedal steel
Dave Roe – upright bass
Leon Michels – keyboards
Richard Swift – drums, guitar, keyboards, backing vocals
Tchad Blake – mixing
Collin Dupuis – recording

Charts

References

2016 albums
The Pretenders albums
Albums produced by Dan Auerbach
BMG Rights Management albums